Union City School District is a comprehensive community public school district that serves students in pre-kindergarten through twelfth grade in Union City, New Jersey, United States. The district is one of 31 former Abbott districts statewide that were established pursuant to the decision by the New Jersey Supreme Court in Abbott v. Burke which are now referred to as "SDA Districts" based on the requirement for the state to cover all costs for school building and renovation projects in these districts under the supervision of the New Jersey Schools Development Authority.
As of the 2018–19 school year, the district, comprised of 14 schools, had an enrollment of 13,768 students and 837.2 classroom teachers (on an FTE basis), for a student–teacher ratio of 16.4:1.

The district is classified by the New Jersey Department of Education as being in District Factor Group "A", the lowest of eight groupings. District Factor Groups organize districts statewide to allow comparison by common socioeconomic characteristics of the local districts. From lowest socioeconomic status to highest, the categories are A, B, CD, DE, FG, GH, I and J.

The city's single public high school, Union City High School, opened September 3, 2009, and was built on the site of the former Roosevelt Stadium. The $178 million school, whose signature feature is an athletic field on its second floor roof, replaced the former Emerson High School and Union Hill High School, which converted to middle schools.

Awards and recognition
Woodrow Wilson School was awarded the Blue Ribbon School Award of Excellence by the United States Department of Education, the highest award an American school can receive, during the 2004-05 school year. The Blue Ribbon School Award of Excellence was awarded again to Woodrow Wilson for the 2014-2015 school year.

Schools

Schools in the district (with 2018–19 enrollment data from the National Center for Education Statistics) are:
Preschool
Eugenio Maria de Hostos Center for Early Childhood Education (298; grades PreK - K)
Elementary schools
Thomas A. Edison Elementary School (1,019; PreK - 6)
Sara Gilmore Academy School (399; 1 - 8)
Henry Hudson Elementary School (367; PreK - 2)
Jefferson Elementary School (329; PreK-4)
Colin Powell Elementary School (833; K - 5)
Theodore Roosevelt School (1,010; K - 6)
Veteran's Memorial Elementary School (606; PreK - 5)
George Washington Elementary School (796; PreK - 6)
Robert Waters Elementary School (1,084; PreK - 6)
Middle schools 
Emerson Middle School (1,023; 6 - 8)
Union Hill Middle School (885; 7 - 8)
High school
José Martí STEM Academy (700; 9-12)
Union City High School (2,882; 9 - 12)
Adult education
Union City Adult Learning Center

Administration
Core members of the district's administration are:
Silvia Abbato, Superintendent
Anthony N. Dragona, Business Administrator
Justin Mercado, Board Secretary

Board of education
The district's board of education is comprised of seven members who set policy and oversee the fiscal and educational operation of the district through its administration. As a Type I school district, the board's trustees are appointed by the Mayor to serve three-year terms of office on a staggered basis, with either two or three members up for reappointment each year. Of the more than 600 school districts statewide, Union City is one of 15 districts with appointed school boards. The board appoints a superintendent to oversee the district's day-to-day operations and a business administrator to supervise the business functions of the district.

References

External links

Union City School District

School Data for the Union City School District, National Center for Education Statistics

Union City, New Jersey
New Jersey Abbott Districts
New Jersey District Factor Group A
School districts in Hudson County, New Jersey